Weija constituency (now defunct) is a precursor constituency which was demarcated into three new constituencies – Anyaa-Sowutuom, Bortianor-Ngleshie-Amanfrom, and Weija-Gbawe ahead of the Ghanaian 2012 general elections  . It no longer has a representation in the Parliament of Ghana and does not elect a Member of Parliament (MP). The former Weija is located in the Ga West District of the Greater Accra Region of Ghana.

Members of Parliament

Elections

See also
List of Ghana Parliament constituencies

References

Parliamentary constituencies in the Greater Accra Region